Phil Houston is a former New Zealand rugby league referee. An international referee, Houston has also controlled Auckland Rugby League, New Zealand Rugby League, Australian Rugby League and Super League matches.

Domestic career
From the Te Atatu club, Houston was the New Zealand Rugby League's Referee of the year in 1994 and controlled the 1994 Lion Red Cup Grand Final.

Between 1995 and 1997 Houston controlled five first grade matches in Australasian competitions.

International career
He controlled two Australia v New Zealand test matches in 1995 and in November 1997 he refereed all three matches of the Super League Test series between Great Britain and Australia in England.

References

Year of birth missing (living people)
Living people
New Zealand rugby league referees
National Rugby League referees